Tetrosomus gibbosus, commonly called camel cowfish because of the hump on its dorsal keel, is one of 22 species in the boxfish family, Ostraciidae. It is a ray finned fish. Other common names include helmet cowfish, humpback turretfish and thornbacked boxfish. It is  most closely related to Tetrosomus reipublicae, the smallspine turretfish. T. gibbosus is a species of boxfish found in the wide Indo-West Pacific. It has been recorded  since 1988 on rare occasions in the Levantine waters of the Mediterranean Sea, likely following entry via the Suez Canal. It is the first species from the family Ostraciidae to be found in the Mediterranean Sea. 

It carries some value in the aquarium trade, but is difficult to keep.

Description 

T. gibbosus is normally around 20 cm (7.9 in) long when it is fully grown, but can reach up to 30 cm (11.8 in) in length. Fish in the genus Tetrosomus are characterized by the presence of a carapace, a hard upper shell formed by thick scale plates. The body is completely encased in this bony shell, except for a few small openings such as the mouth, eyes, and gills. The mouth is small with fleshy lips and conical teeth usually numbering less than 15.

Biology 
T. gibbosus has poisonous flesh, organs, and spines, and is known to secret poisonous mucus in defense or when it is disturbed. This poison can be fatal to humans or other marine organisms that come into contact with it. T. gibbosus is hermaphroditic; all individuals of this species are born female, but some may change into males as they grow. Juveniles live together in small schools, but individuals become solitary as they mature into adulthood. T. gibbosus is an omnivorous species, and its diet is known to include seaweeds, sponges, molluscs, worms, and crustaceans found on the bottom of its habitat.

Distribution and habitat 
T. gibbosus lives in shallow tropical waters or warm seas with muddy bottoms and can sometimes be seen near shallow seagrass beds. It is also found in coral reefs. It is considered an endangered species in the South China Sea.

References

External links
 Humpback Turretfish @ Fishes of Australia

Ostraciidae
Fish of the Indian Ocean
Fish of the Red Sea
Marine fauna of East Africa
Marine fish of Southeast Asia
Marine fish of Northern Australia
Fish described in 1758
Taxa named by Carl Linnaeus